Fernando Bribiesca Sahagún (born 16 August 1981) is a Mexican politician affiliated with the PANAL. As of 2013 he served as Deputy of the LXII Legislature of the Mexican Congress representing Guanajuato.

He is the younger son of the former First Lady Marta Sahagún.

References

1981 births
Living people
People from Zamora, Michoacán
Politicians from Michoacán
New Alliance Party (Mexico) politicians
21st-century Mexican politicians
Deputies of the LXII Legislature of Mexico
Members of the Chamber of Deputies (Mexico) for Guanajuato